John Warren may refer to:

Medicine
 John Warren (surgeon) (1753–1815), American surgeon during the Revolutionary War
 John Collins Warren (1778–1856), American surgeon
 John Collins Warren Jr. (1842–1927), American surgeon, son of John Collins Warren
 John Warren (1874-1928) (1874–1928), professor of anatomy at Harvard University
 John Robin Warren (born 1937), pathologist

Politics
 John Warren (Dover MP) (died 1547), MP for Dover (UK Parliament constituency)
 John Borlase Warren (1753–1822), English admiral, politician, and diplomat
Sir John Borlase Warren (1800 ship)
 John Warren (Upper Canada politician) (died 1832), merchant and politician in Upper Canada
 John Henry Warren (died 1885), English-born merchant and politician in Newfoundland
 John Holden Warren (1825–1901), Wisconsin state senator
 John Warren (Australian politician) (1830–1914), Australian pastoralist and politician
 John Warren (trade unionist) (1895–1960), British trade unionist

Sports
 John Warren (South African cricketer) (1873–1900), South African cricketer
 John A. Warren (1904–1981), American football and basketball coach at the University of Oregon
 John Warren (basketball) (born 1947), NBA
 Johnny Warren (1943–2004), Australian soccer player, coach
 John Warren (American football) (born 1960), punter in the NFL for the Dallas Cowboys
 John Warren (born 1960), racing manager of Queen Elizabeth's horses
 John Warren (Indian cricketer), played for Bengal

Other
 John Warren (actor) (1916–1977), British screenwriter and actor, wrote Two-Way Stretch
 John Warren (bishop) (1730–1800), Archdeacon of Worcester, Bishop of Saint David's, Wales, Bishop of Bangor, Wales
 Jean Baptiste François Joseph de Warren (1769–1830), known as John Warren, surveyor and astronomer in the English East India Company
 John Warren (mathematician) (1796–1852), English mathematician and Fellow of the Royal Society
 John Warren (British Army soldier) (died 1813), soldier, official and merchant in Upper Canada
 John Warren (convict) (1826–1898), convict transported to Western Australia
 John Warren, 3rd Baron de Tabley (1835–1895), English poet, numismatist, botanist and authority on bookplates
 John F. Warren (1909–2000), American cinematographer for The Country Girl
 John Warren (journalist) (born 1937), anchored CBC Parliamentary Television Network
 John Warren (Canadian musician) (born 1938), Canadian baritone saxophonist and composer
 John E. Warren Jr. (1946–1969), U.S. Army officer and Vietnam War Medal of Honor recipient
 John Warren (priest) (1767–1838),  Dean of Bangor
 John Warren (mining) (1837–1910), mining engineer and mine manager in Australia